

Notable former senators

Yldefonso Solá Morales (1941–1949)
Santos P. Amadeo the "Champion of Habeas Corpus"
Rubén Berríos Martínez (1973–1977,1985–1989,1993–2000) PIP-At Large (long-time political activist for the Puerto Rican independence movement, current president of the PIP party)
Ruth Fernández (1973–1981), PPD-At Large (Puerto Rican Singer)
Luis A. Ferré (1977–1984), PNP At-large, Eighth President of the Senate, third elected Governor
Charles H. Juliá
Fernando Martín García (1989–1993, 2001–2005) PIP-At Large
Kenneth McClintock (1993–2008) "PNP-At Large", Thirteenth President of the Senate (2005-2008), 22nd Secretary of State (2009-2013)
Luis Muñoz Marín (1941–48, 1965–70), PPD, Fourth President of the Senate, first elected Governor
Victoria Muñoz Mendoza (1986–1993) PPD-At Large, former PPD 1992 gubernatorial candidate (daughter of Luis Muñoz Marín)
Luis Negrón López, former PPD 1968 gubernatorial candidate, Senate Majority Leader and Vice President
Héctor O'Neill García (1989–1993) PNP-Bayamón (former mayor of Guaynabo)
Miriam J.Ramirez de Ferrer (2000-2004) "PNP- At Large",
Ramón Luis Rivera Cruz (1993–2001) PNP-Bayamón (current mayor of Bayamón)
Pedro Rosselló González (2005–2009), PNP-Arecibo, former Governor
Jorge Santini Padilla (1997–2001) PNP-San Juan (former mayor of San Juan)
Alfonso Valdés Cobián

Former senators

The following is a list of former senators of Puerto Rico, along with their years of service and the senatorial district they represented.

New Progressive Party
Roberto Arango  (2005-2011) San Juan
Carmen Luz Berríos Rivera  (1997–2001) Guayama
Norma Carranza de León  (1993–2001,2003–2005) Arecibo
David Cruz Vélez  (1989–1993) At Large
Carlos Dávila López  (1997–2001) Humacao
Jorge De Castro Font  (2004-2008) "At Large"
Carlos Díaz  (2004-2008) "At Large"
Luis A. Ferré  (1976–1980) "At Large"
José Garriga Picó  (2005-2009) At Large
Francisco González Rodríguez  (1997–2001) San Juan
Roger Iglesias  (1993–2001, 2011–present) Carolina
Luisa Lebrón Burgos  (1993–2000) Carolina
Miguel Loiz Zayas  (1993–1997) Humacao
Danny López Soto (1976–1984) Carolina'Víctor Loubriel Ortiz  (Jan. 2-4 2005) AreciboVíctor Marrero Padilla  (1993–2000) AreciboAníbal Marrero Pérez  (1984–2000) BayamónHéctor Martínez Maldonado  (2005-2011) CarolinaHéctor Martínez Colón  (1969–1973) "Ponce"
Kenneth McClintock  (1993–2008) "At Large"
José Enrique Meléndez Ortiz  (1993–2001) GuayamaLuis Felipe Navas de León  (1993–2000) HumacaoNicolás Nogueras Cartagena  (1973–1985, 1989–1996) At LargeCarlos Pagán  (1997-2001, 2005-2009) MayagüezOrlando Parga  (1999-2008) At LargeSergio Peña Clos  (1981–2005) At LargeMiriam Ramírez de Ferrer  (2001-2005) At LargeOreste Ramos Díaz  (1977–1997) San JuanRoberto Rexach Benítez  (1985–1998) At LargeCharles Rodríguez Colón  (1993–2001) At LargeRafael Rodríguez González  (1993–1997) MayagüezEnrique Rodríguez Negrón  (1989–2001) At LargeRolando Silva Iglesias  (1981–1996) San JuanAntonio Soto Díaz  (2008-2011) GuayamaAngel Tirado Martínez  (2000–2001) AreciboFreddy Valentín Acevedo  (1993–1997) At LargeLuis Felipe Vázquez Ortiz  (1996–1997) San JuanDennis Vélez Barlucea  (1993–1997) PonceEduardo Zavála Vázquez  (1993–1997) PoncePopular Democratic Party
Modesto Agosto Alicea  (1997-2005) PonceEudaldo Báez Galib  (1993-2005) At LargeEduardo Bhatia Gautier  (1997–2001, 2009-) At LargePalmira Cabrera de Ibarra  (1960–1968) AreciboElsie Calderón de Hernández  (1985–1993) CarolinaJuan Cancel Ríos  (1969–1976) "Arecibo"
Juan Cancel Alegría  (2001–2005) CarolinaMiguel Deynes Soto  (1973–1993) Mayagüez-AguadillaCarlos García Portela  (1965–1968) "San Juan"
Velda González de Modestti  (1981–2005) At LargeAna Nisi Goyco Graciani  (1981–1993) PonceMiguel Hernández Agosto  (1970–1997) At LargeSixto Hernández Serrano  (2001–2006) HumacaoRafael Irizarry  (2000–2005) Mayagüez-AguadillaLuis Izquierdo Mora  (1981–1993) At LargeAmérico Martínez  (1981–1993) AreciboYasmín Mejías Lugo  (2001–2005) CarolinaJorge Orama Monroig  (1989–1992) PonceRené Muñoz Padín  (1965–1968) San JuanJosé Ortiz Dalliot  (2001–2005) San JuanMargarita Ostolaza Bey  (2001–2005) San JuanMercedes Otero de Ramos  (1993–2001) At LargeJoaquín Peña Peña  (1985–1993) CarolinaRoberto Prats Palerm  (2001–2005) At LargeBruno Ramos  (1997-2005) PonceJorge Alberto Ramos Comas  (1997–2000) MayagüezMarco Antonio Rigau  (1989–1997) At LargeGilberto Rivera Ortiz  (1970–1993) HumacaoJuan Rivera Ortiz  (1973–1993, 1996–1997) GuayamaJulio Rodríguez Gómez  (2002–2005) AreciboMaribel Rodríguez Hernández  (2001–2002) AreciboRafael Rodríguez Vargas  (2001–2005) AreciboEdgardo Rosario Burgos  (1989–1993) AreciboJesús Santa Aponte  (1977–1993) HumacaoCirilo Tirado Delgado  (1989–1997) GuayamaRoberto Vigoreaux Lorenzana  (2001–2005) At LargeEugenio Fernández Cerra  (1960–1964) At LargeJorge Alberto Ramos Vélez  (2001-2004) MayagüezPuerto Rican Independence Party
Rubén Berríos  "At Large"
Gilberto Concepción De Gracia  "At Large"
Fernando Martín García  (2001–2005) "At Large"
Manuel Rodríguez Orellana  (2000–2001) At Large''
María de Lourdes Santiago  (2005–2008) "At Large"